"Somebody That I Used to Know" is a 2011 song by Gotye featuring Kimbra. 

 Somebody That I Used to Know (True Blood), the eighth episode of the fifth season
 "Somebody That I Used to Know", a song by Elliott Smith from the 2000 album Figure 8